Rahşan Ecevit (née Aral, 17 December 1923 – 17 January 2020) was a Turkish author, painter and politician. She was the second lady of Turkey four times during her husband Bülent Ecevit's prime ministries.

Biography
She was born in Bursa, Turkey. Her family originated from Thessaloniki and had initially settled in Şebinkarahisar, a town in Giresun province in northeastern Turkey, after the population exchange in 1920. Her father was Namık Zeki Aral and her mother Zahide Aral. In 1944 Rahşan graduated from the American high school Robert College in Istanbul. She married her classmate Bülent Ecevit in 1946.

Following the military coup in 1980 led by General Kenan Evren, her husband was imprisoned and was suspended from active politics for life. Bülent Ecevit's party, the Republican People's Party (CHP), was closed down. On 14 November 1985, Rahşan founded a centre left social democratic party, the Democratic Left Party (DSP), and led it until her husband's ban from politics was lifted in 1987.

Rahşan Ecevit was the vice president of the Democratic Left Party and responsible for the party's organization between 1989 and 2004. She became the leader of the new Democratic Left People's Party (DSHP) on 17 January 2010 when the DSP seemed to no longer have any chance to win seats in elections. After Kemal Kılıçdaroğlu had become the leader of the CHP and halted the rightist trend within the party, she disbanded her new party and with many members joined the now rather social democratic CHP.

On 5 November 2006, her husband died following an almost 6-month long medically induced coma.

Rahşan Ecevit died on 17 January 2020 at a hospital in Ankara and was buried next to her husband in the Turkish State Cemetery a few days later.

See also
 Women in Turkish politics
List of prime ministers of Turkey

References

External links

1923 births
2020 deaths
People from Bursa
Democratic Left Party (Turkey) politicians
Alumni of Arnavutköy American High School for Girls
20th-century Turkish women politicians
Democratic Left People's Party politicians
Female party leaders of Turkey
Burials at Turkish State Cemetery
Rahsan
21st-century Turkish women politicians